Victoria Avenue may refer to:

Canada
Victoria Avenue (Hamilton, Ontario)
Victoria Avenue (Saint-Lambert, Quebec)
Victoria Avenue (Regina, Saskatchewan)
 Victoria Avenue (Montreal and Westmount)

Elsewhere
Victoria Avenue, Perth, Australia
Victoria Avenue, Cambridge, Britain
Victoria Avenue (Jersey)
Victoria Avenue (Riverside, California), United States

See also 
List of places named after Queen Victoria
 Queen Victoria Street (disambiguation)
 Victoria (disambiguation)
 Victoria Street (disambiguation)